Dragobraća (Cyrillic: Драгобраћа ) is a settlement located in the Stanovo municipality, in the Šumadija District of Serbia.

The population of the village is 845 (2002 census), most of whom are ethnic Serbs.

Kragujevac neighborhoods
Šumadija
Populated places in Šumadija District